Najm ud-din Ali Khan, better known as Najm-ud-Daulah (or Nazam-ud-Daulah)  (ca. 1747– 8 May 1766), was the Nawab of Bengal and Bihar from 1765 to 1766. He was the second son of Mir Jafar.

Najm-ud-Daulah was crowned as the Nawab following the death of his father Mir Jafar. During his coronation he was only 15 years old. He ascended to the throne on February 5, 1765.

In 1765 after the victory in the Battle of Buxar the British had formally gained Dewani of Bengal and Bihar from Shah Alam II. The Nawab formally conferred this Dewani to the British on September 30, 1765.

Najmuddin died soon afterwards, on May 8, 1766, apparently from a fever caught at a formal party given at Murshidabad fort in honour of Robert Clive. He was buried at Jafraganj Cemetery and was succeeded by his younger brother Nawab Nazim Najabat Ali Khan.

Life

Birth
Nazam-ud-Daulah was the son of Munni Begum (noble) and Mir Jafar.

Nazam-ud-Daulah was appointed as Mir Jafar's heir with the title of Murshidzada Bahadur, by Mir Jafar himself on 29 January 1764.

Reign as a Nawab
After the death of Mir Jafar Nawab Nazim Najm-ud-din Ali Khan succeeded him to the Nawab's throne under the titles of Shuja-ul-Mulk (Hero of the Country), Nazam-ud-Daulah (Star of the State) and Mahabat Jang (Horror in War) at the age of 15 on February 5, 1765; it was confirmed by the East India Company on February 23, 1765. This cost him £140,000 which was divided among the members of the Calcutta Council.

Death and succession
Nawab Nazim Najm-ud-din Ali Khan died on May 8, 1766 of fever he caught at a party, which was given in honour of Robert Clive. The Nawab was buried at Jafarganj Cemetery on the west of his father, Mir Jafar's grave. The Nawab was childless. Najabat Ali Khan, Nazim-ud-din's brother, according to Mohammedan law was the right successor of the late Nawab, on the throne. Thus, Najim-ud-din was succeeded by his brother as Nawab Nazim Najabat Ali Khan.

See also
 Nawabs of Bengal
 List of rulers of Bengal
 History of Bengal
 History of Bangladesh
 History of India
 Shia Islam in India

References
 
 

Nawabs of Bengal
People from British India
1740s births
Year of birth uncertain
1766 deaths
18th-century Indian monarchs